Grange is a village on the N15 national primary road in County Sligo, Ireland. It is located between Benbulben mountain and the Atlantic Ocean. Streedagh, a townland near Grange, is the location of a large sandy beach, three Armada wrecks and a salt water lagoon that is an area of Special Conservation. Streedagh strand is also a surfing destination.

A short distance to the north are the towns of Ballyshannon and Bundoran, a surfing and seaside resort which are both bypassed, and the villages of Tullaghan and Cliffoney. To the south are Drumcliff, burial place of poet and Nobel laureate W. B. Yeats, and Sligo town.

History
The old village is on the hill to the north of the present village. Grange developed on land belonging to the Cistercian monastery of Boyle in County Roscommon.
Grange village was a stronghold of the O'Harte and O'Connor families throughout the Medieval period. The O'Hartes provided cavalry for the O'Connor Sligo Lords of Carbury-Drumcliff.

A castle once stood near the center of the village. The Annals of Ireland record that in 1604 a "‘new castle and 7 cottages were built by Hugh O’Hart in the town of Grange, Co. Sligo.’"

After the 1641 rebellion, the land was granted to Thomas Soden. Col. W. Wood-Martin, the Irish historian, writes that Thomas Soden was probably an officer in Col. Richard Coote's Regiment of Horse, one of the Cromwellian regiments disbanded in the County of Sligo. He adds that he received in lieu of arrears of pay, a grant of the town, townland and castle, of Grange, County Sligo. Grange is located nine miles north of the town of Sligo on the road to Bundoran. He received this grant on 13 April 1668, under the "'Act of Settlement'."

Lola Montez
Grange is the birthplace of Lola Montez - dancer, courtesan and mistress of King Ludwig I of Bavaria.

Born Eliza Rosanna Gilbert in Sligo, Lola caught the eye of Bavaria's King Ludwig I in 1846 by claiming to be an exotic dancer from Spain. Although married, the king took up with the girl from Grange, even making her the Duchess of Landsfeld. Bavarian citizens put up with their king's cavorting, but their patience snapped when his courtesan began meddling in state affairs. Ludwig was forced to abdicate and Lola had to flee. She never saw him again, but she remained a duchess.

Spanish Armada

Three Spanish Armada transport ships - La Lavia, La Juliana and the Santa Maria de Vison - were lost off Streedagh strand in September 1588, an event commemorated by a monument close to the beach.  One of the survivors, Captain Francisco de Cuéllar, recorded the events of the time in detail.  He documents his shipwreck at Streedagh, the subsequent events ashore, and his attempts to find hospitality from local chieftains (O'Rourke and McClancy) in the then English garrisoned North Sligo, as he made his way back to Spain via Antrim and Scotland.

In 1985 at Streedagh Strand, marine archaeologists discovered the wreck site of the three ships of the Spanish Armada. In spring 2015, after storms sent some artifacts onto Streedagh Strand, Ireland's Department of Arts, Heritage, and the Gaeltacht sent divers to recover what the storms had uncovered. One particular find was a bronze cannon decorated with the image of Saint Matrona of Barcelona, which bears the initial "D" on its touchhole – the mark of the Genoese gunfounder Girardi Dorino II. Other pieces with this mark recovered from the wreck indicate that he cast most of what became La Juliana's bronze ordnance. The cannon is dated 1570, which corresponds to the date of La Juliana's construction; according to the Irish government, this puts the identity of the third wreck "beyond doubt".

A Spanish Armada interpretive centre opened at Grange's old courthouse in 2018.

Modern history
In 2012 Grange was briefly featured in the national news when someone discovered early 20th century Mills type 36 grenades at a private residence in the village. Grange then made national news in August that year when a herd of 105 sheep were stolen in one swoop. A sperm whale washed up on the shore close to Grange in 2019.

Amenities
There are two schools in the village, a Roman Catholic church, and church hall, post office, and bathroom store.

The Church of Mary Immaculate combines modern with traditional elements, particularly lancet windows. It has a nave with five bays and its sacristy is in the corner, north-east. Its roof is pyramidal and has a carved limestone cross set above an ashlar limestone bell-cot with chamfered podium within whose pointed arch opening is the bell.

Sport and leisure
North Sligo Sports Complex is located in the village. The complex has an indoor soccer pitch, also used for badminton and basketball. There is a squash court, racquetball court and changing room facilities and meeting room in the complex. Outside the complex, there is a running track, where North Sligo Athletic Club meet (as well as at Oxfield Sports Centre), a grass soccer pitch and an all-weather soccer pitch. There was also a community park, now converted to a playground. At the north end of the village is a pitch, Molaise Park, where local Gaelic football teams train and play. The local GAA club celebrated its centenary in 2007.

People
 Caroline Currid, sport psychologist
 Eugene Gilbride, TD
 Tom Gilmartin, businessman, whistleblower and pivotal Mahon Tribunal witness
 Cyril Haran, Gaelic footballer/manager and local priest
 Mona McSharry, swimmer
Christopher O'Donnell, Ireland International track and field athlete
 Lola Montez, Gräfin von Landsfeld

See also
 List of towns and villages in the Republic of Ireland

References

External links
 The Parish of Ahamlish, North Sligo

Towns and villages in County Sligo